Giovanni Ulisse Lucci (active 1717-1760s) was an Italian painter of the late-Baroque period, active near his native Fabriano in the Region of the Marche. He trained with his father, the painter Giovanni Luca Lucci (1637-1740) also of Fabriano. He painted frescoes for the churcho of San Benedetto and San Silvestro in Fabriano.

References

Year of birth unknown
Year of death unknown
18th-century Italian painters
Italian male painters
18th-century Italian male artists